Diplogyniidae is a family of parasitic mites belonging to the order Mesostigmata. Many are parasites on beetles but some live on larger animals (e.g., rats).

Taxonomy
This is a list of the described species. The data is taken from Joel Hallan's Biology Catalog.

 Bilongicauda Elsen, 1975
 Bilongicauda brevis Elsen, 1981 — host unspecified beetle; Ivory Coast
 Bilongicauda gigantica Elsen, 1981 — host unspecified beetle; Congo: Kinshasa
 Bilongicauda microseta Elsen, 1981 — host Didimus aloysi sabandiae  (Coleoptera: Passalidae); Congo Kinshasa
 Bilongicauda modesta Elsen, 1981 — host Pentalobus barbatus  (Coleoptera: Passalidae); Congo Kinshasa
 Bilongicauda triseta Elsen, 1981 — host unspecified beetle; Congo Kinshasa
 Bingervillia P. Elsen, 1981
 Bingervillia hirsuta P. Elsen, 1981
 Burgeonium Elsen, 1975
 Burgeonium latipecten Elsen, 1975
 Burgeonium megabasis Elsen, 1981 — host Pentalobus simia  (Coleoptera: Passalidae); Congo Kinshasa
 Burgeonium prolongus Elsen, 1981 — host Coleoptera; Ivory Coast
 Burgeonium retrolongus Elsen, 1981 — host Coleoptera; Ivory Coast
 Brachysternum Trägårdh, 1950
 Brachysternum acuminatum Trägårdh, 1950
 Brachysternopsis P. E. Hunter, 1993
 Brachysternopsis flechtmanni P. E. Hunter, 1993
 Ceratocelaenopsis Trägårdh, 1950
 Ceratocelaenopsis womersleyi Trägårdh, 1950
 Cingulacarus Elsen, 1975
 Cingulacarus gangeticus Elsen, 1975
 Crassoseta P. E. Hunter, 1993
 Crassoseta cornutum (Hyatt, 1964)
 Crassoseta fonsecai Hunter, 1993 — host Passalus coniferus (Coleoptera: Passalidae); Brazil
 Crassoseta roseae Hunter, 1993 — host Passalus convexus; Brazil
 Crassoseta starri P. E. Hunter, 1993
 Crenamargo Hicks, 1958
 Crenamargo binuseta Hicks, 1958
 Cryptometasternum Trägårdh, 1950
 Cryptometasternum aequalis Karg, 1997 — host Passalidae  (Coleoptera); Irian Jaya
 Cryptometasternum derricki Womersley, 1958
 Cryptometasternum eboris Elsen, 1981 — host Coleoptera; Ivory Coast
 Cryptometasternum natalense Trägårdh, 1950
 Cryptometasternum queenslandense Womersley, 1958
 Diplogyniella Trägårdh, 1950
 Diplogyniella gayi Womersley, 1958
 Diplogyniella levinseni Trägårdh, 1950
 Diplogyniopsis Trägårdh, 1950
 Diplogyniopsis multidentata Trägårdh, 1950
 Diplogynium G. Canestrini, 1888
 Diplogynium acuminatum G. Canestrini, 1888
 Diplogynium oryctae Vishnupriya & Mohanasundaram, 1988 — host Oryctes rhinoceros  (Coleoptera: Dynastinae); India
 Discretoseta P. Elsen, 1981
 Discretoseta cochlearia P. Elsen, 1981
 Eboriella P. Elsen, 1981
 Eboriella globuloseta P. Elsen, 1981
 Forkosclerite A. Kumar-Datta, 1985
 Forkosclerite assamensis A. Kumar-Datta, 1985
 Heveacarus Elsen, 1974
 Heveacarus splendidus Elsen, 1974
 Heterodiplogynium Trägårdh, 1950
 Heterodiplogynium vestitum Trägårdh, 1950
 Hirsutocapillus P. Elsen, 1981
 Hirsutocapillus lukombensis P. Elsen, 1981
 Lobogyniella Krantz, 1958
 Lobogyniella Trägårdhi Krantz, 1958
 Lobogynium Trägårdh, 1950
 Lobogynium rotumdtum Trägårdh, 1950
 Brachylobogynium Bhattacharyya, 1969
 Brachylobogynium setosum Bhattacharyya, 1969
 Lobogynoides Trägårdh, 1950
 Lobogynoides andreinii (Berlese, 1909)
 Lobogynoides obtusum Trägårdh, 1950
 Megachaetochela Trägårdh, 1950
 Megachaetochela warreni Trägårdh, 1950
 Microdiplogynium Trägårdh, 1950
 Microdiplogynium reticulatum Trägårdh, 1950
 Monodiplogynium Womersley, 1958
 Monodiplogynium carabi Womersley, 1958
 Neolobogynium Hicks, 1957
 Neolobogynium lateriseta Hicks, 1957
 Neodiplogynium Trägårdh, 1950
 Neodiplogynium schubarti Trägårdh, 1950
 Neodiplogynium eusetosum Karg, 1997 — New Caledonia
 Neodiplogynium vallei Fox, 1959 — host is Rattus norvegicus (Brown rat); Puerto Rico
 Ophiocelaeno Johnston & Fain, 1964
 Ophiocelaeno sellnicki Johnston & Fain, 1964
 Ophiocelaeno sudhiri Kumar-Datta, 1985 — India
 Paradiplogynium Womersley, 1958
 Paradiplogynium nahmani Seeman, 2007 — host is Titanolabis colossea
 Paradiplogynium panesthia Womersley, 1958
 Passalacarus Pearse & Wharton, 1936
 Passalacarus brooksi Womersley, 1958
 Pseudodiplogyniopsis P. Elsen, 1981
 Pseudodiplogyniopsis garba P. Elsen, 1981
 Pseudofusio P. Elsen, 1981
 Pseudofusio hulstaerti P. Elsen, 1981
 Pseudofusio membranus Elsen, 1981 — host unspecified beetle; Ivory Coast
 Pseudofusio microcorniculus Elsen, 1981 — host unspecified beetle; Ivory Coast
 Pyramidogynium Elsen, 1974
 Pyramidogynium etataensis Elsen, 1974
 Quadristernoseta Elsen, 1975
 Quadristernoseta schoutedeni Elsen, 1975
 Quadristernoseta intermedia Elsen, 1981 — host Pentalobus barbatus  (Coleoptera); Congo Kinshasa
 Quadristernoseta longigynium Elsen, 1981 — host Tenebrionidae  (Coleoptera); Congo Kinshasa
 Schizodiplogynium Trägårdh, 1950
 Schizodiplogynium capillatum Trägårdh, 1950
 Spatulosternum Elsen, 1974
 Spatulosternum microspinosus Elsen, 1974
 Trichodiplogynium Trägårdh, 1950
 Trichodiplogynium hirsutum Trägårdh, 1950
 Trichodiplogynium mesoamericanum Wisniewski & Hirschmann, 1993 — host Veturius platyrhinus (Coleoptera: Passalidae); Central America
 Tridiplogynium Trägårdh, 1950
 Tridiplogynium inexpectatum Trägårdh, 1950
 Weiseronyssus Samsinak, 1962
 Weiseronyssus mirus Samsinak, 1962

References

Mesostigmata
Acari families